Langeloh is a village within the town of Schneverdingen in the district of Soltau-Fallingbostel in the North German state of Lower Saxony. The parish is characterised by fields and moors with farm woodland and borders on the Pietzmoor.

History 
On 28 June 1519 in the village of Langeloh the last knights' battle in Europe - the Battle of Soltau - took place as part of the Hildesheim Diocesan Feud. A force of Hildesheim and Lüneburg troops destroyed the Brunswick-Welf army. Formerly an independent municipality, it is part of the town Schneverdingen since 1974.

Politics 
The parish chair is Regina Dinges.

Culture and places of interest 
Near Langeloh is a field of tumuli. 
The Böhmetal bei Huckenrieth nature reserve is partly located in the parish of Langeloh.

External links 
 Official website of the town of Schneverdingen
 

Villages in Lower Saxony
Heidekreis
Lüneburg Heath